The Lost 52 Project is a private organization founded by Tim Taylor to do research on the 52 US Navy submarines lost on patrol during the Second World War, performing discovery, exploration, and underwater archeology where possible.

Found, so far:
USS Stickleback (SS-415), August 2019, sank during Cold War, located near Honolulu Hawaii.
USS Grayback (SS-208), June 2019, located near  Okinawa Japan
USS Robalo (SS-273), May 2019, located near  Balabec Straight Philippines
USS Grunion (SS-216), August 2006-2018,  located near   Kiska, Alaska
USS S-28 (SS-133), September 2017,  located near  Honolulu Hawaii
USS S-26 (SS-131), September 2014,  located near  Pacific Panama 
USS R-12 (SS-89), October 2010,  located near      Key West, Florida 
USS Flier (SS-250), May 2009, located near    Palawan Island 
USS Wahoo (SS-238), July 2006, located near  La Pérouse Strait
USS Lagarto (SS-371), May 2006, located near Gulf of Thailand

References

External links
 

World War II submarines of the United States